Trechus amblygonus is a species of ground beetle in the subfamily Trechinae. It was described by Jeannel in 1935.

References

amblygonus
Beetles described in 1935